John Fergus may refer to:

 John Fergus (scholar) (c. 1700–c. 1761), Irish physician and man of letters
 John Fergus (politician) (died 1865), British politician